Kim Prisu, a pseudonym for Joaquim António Gonçalves Borregana (born 15 November 1962), is a Portuguese painter. After 34 years in France, he once again lives in Portugal. His work combines Figuration Libre, French street art of the 1980s, digital imaging and Art singulier.

Early life and education

Born in Aldeia da Dona, Sabugal, Portugal, he moved to France in 1963 and was educated there. He began making art at the age of 12 with comic strips.

Career

In 1977, he started hanging out in Paris, initially interested in rock and other urban music. Not being interested in making music himself, he started promoting friends' groups with hand-made posters that he had photocopied, and also by stencilling groups' names.

In 1979, at the invitation of his drawing instructor, he had his first group show, and the same year with Joaquim Pereira he founded the group "Explorateurs du gris". In 1980 he came up with the concept of Nuklé-Art, global interdisciplinary art for the children of the Nuclear Age; in 1984 this led to his co-founding the group of the same name with Kriki (Christian Vallée) and Paul Etherno. The group dissolved in mid-1987 into the Médias-Peintres, whose activities are close to those of Figuration Libre, including street stencilling, postering of painted work and performance art. Nuklé-Art exhibited at gallery Patras and the Galerie Photo graffitis, participated in the first Binoche sale, the 1986 Les jeunes débarquent and are in the book Pochoir a la Une and in Jacques Renard's film Murmures Impatiens in the series Paris impromptu.

In 1990, he painted on the Berlin Wall, on 9 of the 1,300 metres that remain and make up the East Side Gallery. He painted there again in 2009 to celebrate the 20th anniversary of the fall of the wall.

In the 1990s he exhibited at Paris galleries including Anne Rouff, Christophe, and the galerie sanguine. In 1996 he returned to Portugal.

Kim Prisu's work is his own response to the global tribe in a world constantly changing, a singular vision of contemporaneity; a great mix of imagination in colors Videomatik, inspiring in the multicultural mosaic that connects their sensations, emotions and life philosophy to allow us to see a visual concept in various directions from your world.

Today he also works on public art sculptures made from materials of recycling, performance art painting, conceptual and gestural, posters, illustration books, digital and video art, graffiti and stenciling, as well as the tradition of the plastic arts and in azulejos, theatre and Inpensamental poetry. He is a corresponding academic of FEBACLA in Brazil.

References

External links
 Kim Prisu on Blogspot
 List of works
 Nuklé-Art
 

1962 births
Living people
20th-century French painters
French male painters
21st-century French painters
Portuguese painters
Street artists
People from Sabugal
Portuguese emigrants to France